Remanso is located in −9.62, −42 municipality in the state of Bahia in the North-East region of Brazil.

Location

Remanso was relocated from its original location in 1974 with the construction of the Sobradinho Dam, which submerged the original municipality under the Sobradinho Reservoir. It consists of 2 districts: Remanso, the municipal seat, and Poços.
The municipality was designated a priority area for conservation and sustainable use when the Caatinga Ecological Corridor was created in 2006.

History

Remanso was originally inhabited by indigenous people of the Acoroase ethnic group. Refugees of armed conflicts in the nearby municipality of Pilão Arcado arrived in the 19th century. The area was fertile and due to its location on the Old Frank, provided a good site for cattle ranching and fishing. The area quickly attracted new residents who founded the town of Ville de Your Miss of Remanso of Pilão Arcado in 1857. This became an independent municipality on August 9, 1900 under the name of Remanso.

Relocation

Under Brazilian Federal Law n°. 10/77 of January 28, 1977 the municipality was relocated 4.3 miles from its original location in 1974 for the construction of the Sobradinho Dam. The new location, referred to as New Remanso, was constructed by Companhia Hidro Elétrica do São Francisco (São Francisco Hydroelectric Company). The municipality lost a quarter of its territory with the construction of the dam and the old city is now submerged under the Sobradinho Reservoir.

Festivals

Remanso is noted for its micareta, an off-season celebration similar to the Brazilian Carnival. The micareta of Remanso attracts approximately 10M people annually. The municipality also holds the Your Lady Rosário Festival annually in October.

See also
List of municipalities in Bahia

References

Municipalities in Bahia